This article lists periodicals published primarily about institutions, people, or issues of the Latter Day Saint movement.

Early periodicals
The following began publication before Joseph Smith's death on 27 June 1844, after which several followers declared themselves his successor and split into various groups.

The Church of Jesus Christ of Latter-day Saints
Compared with other sects in the Latter Day Saint movement, The Church of Jesus Christ of Latter-day Saints is by far the largest and has published the most.

Official
The following were published by The Church of Jesus Christ of Latter-day Saints or one of its auxiliaries, and are considered official church publications.

Affiliated
The following were published under the sponsorship of the LDS Church or a Church-owned institution or informally adopted by a church auxiliary, but are not considered official church publications.

Other Latter Day Saint denominations
The following were published by religious groups in the Latter Day Saint movement, excluding the LDS Church.

Independent
The following were not published by a Latter Day Saint church or official religious group, but were independently operated and controlled.

Non-English
The following were published in languages other than English.

Notes

References 

 
Latter Day Saint
Latter Day Saint
Periodicals